Mormon Bar is an unincorporated community in Mariposa County, California. Mormon Bar is located near State Route 49.

It was settled during the California Gold Rush. Mormons occupied the place during the winter of 1849/50. It was first mined by veterans of the Mormon Battalion in 1849 after their discharge in 1847. They did not stay very long, and other miners came and occupied the site.

At one time there was a significant Chinese presence there.

Mormon Bar is California Historical Landmark #323.

It is somewhat of a ghost town, and is listed on many maps and ghost town travel guides as such.

References

External links
Placenames
Ghosttowns
Mariposa Historical Landmarks

Unincorporated communities in Mariposa County, California
Mining communities of the California Gold Rush
California Historical Landmarks
Ghost towns in California
Populated places established in 1849
1849 establishments in California
Unincorporated communities in California